Marci X is a 2003 American romantic comedy film directed by Richard Benjamin, written by Paul Rudnick, and starring Lisa Kudrow as Jewish-American Princess Marci Feld, who has to take control of a hip-hop record label, as well as the controversial rapper Dr. S, played by Damon Wayans. The film was released on August 22, 2003, by Paramount Pictures. Marci X received negative reviews and was a box office flop, grossing $1.7 million worldwide against a $20 million budget.

Plot
Marci Feld, a spoiled Jewish-American princess, is forced to take control of her father Ben's hardcore rap label Felony Assault when he suffers a stress-induced heart attack due to the controversy surrounding the label's release of "Shoot Ya' Teacha" by Dr. S. To rescue her father's plummeting stock, Marci attempts to tone down the rapper's bad-boy image. Over time, the unlikely pair falls in love just as conservative senator Mary Ellen Spinkle vows to banish Dr. S and his offensive lyrics from the airwaves forever.

Cast

 Lisa Kudrow as Marci Feld
 Damon Wayans as Dr. S
 Richard Benjamin as Ben Feld
 Jane Krakowski as Lauren Farb
 Christine Baranski as Mary Ellen Spinkle
 Paula Garcés as Yolanda Quinones
 Charles Kimbrough as Lane Strayfield
 Veanne Cox as Caitlin Mellowitz
 Sherie Rene Scott as Kirsten Blatt
 Nashawn Kearse as Quantrelle
 Billy Griffith as Tubby Fenders
 Andrew Keenan-Bolger as Chip Spinkle
 Matthew Morrison as Boyz R Us Member
 Gerry Becker as Dr. Skellar
 Bruce Altman as Stan Dawes
 Walter Bobbie as Walt Seldon
 Mustafa Shakir as Engine Trouble
 Kaity Tong as herself
 Jim Watkins as himself
 Mary Murphy as herself
 Zach Tyler Eisen as Boy
 Alexandra Neil as Auction Woman
 Mimi Weddell as Auction Woman
 Mary Hart as herself
 Hassan Johnson as Tinfoil
 Jade Yorker as Teenager
 Queen Esther as Audience Member
 Dean Edwards as Audience Member
 Lisa Emery as Parent
 Ted Sutton as Chuck Farley
 Erik LaRay Harvey as Stage Manager
 Myk Watford as Police Officer
 Nancy Opel as Reporter
 Jack Koenig as Reporter

Production

Chris Rock was offered the role of Dr. S, but turned it down as he didn't like the script.

Reception

Box office
Marci X earned $872,950 in its opening weekend, ranking #18 in the North American box office from 1,200 venues. The film grossed $1,648,818 at the North American box office, and $26,888 overseas for a worldwide total of $1,675,706. Based on a $20 million budget, the film was a box office bomb.

Critical response
The site's consensus states: "The material is too thin for feature-length, and the jokes are socially outdated and clueless." Metacritic reports a 20 out of 100 rating, based on 17 critics, indicating "generally unfavorable reviews".

Wesley Morris of The Boston Globe felt the film had "no idea what to make of black people or hip-hop culture", noting how Rudnick's script is filled with "half-hearted structuring" and is "exasperating in its enervated, politically toothless jabs." He concluded that Marci X is "just clueless and sad, seemingly having missed the point that hip-hop is no longer a novelty to be slapped on the cheek with a white glove." Nathan Rabin of The A.V. Club also criticized Rudnick's scripting of the film for being "a series of skit ideas strung together", and felt that Wayans was "woefully miscast as a charismatic thug." He concluded by calling it "the year's most misguided culture-clash comedy." The Austin Chronicles Marjorie Baumgarten felt the premise was filled with "possibilities for good culture-clash humor à la Rock 'n' Roll High School," but played everything straightforward, saying that it "exudes the familiar stench of stale comedy routinely tossed into theatres by the studios in the dog days of August when no one's really looking anyway." Ed Gonzalez from Slant Magazine wrote that: "Marci X is a sketch comedy that misses more than it hits. And not unlike Danny DeVito's Death to Smoochy, the worst thing that can be said about it is that it's a good decade too late." Mick LaSalle of the San Francisco Chronicle called it "a dishonest satire that manages to be (disingenuously) contemptuous of white people and (unintentionally) condescending toward black people, without ever being funny." Lou Lumenick of the New York Post derided the movie for being dull in its material about "uptight white people getting jiggy with it", and its jabs at both rich people and hip hop musicians, concluding that "Marci X gives Gigli a run for its money as the summer's worst movie."

The film received some positive reviews. Armond White praised the film's satire of its subject matter, saying it "sarcastically tackles hip hop sanctimony at a time in which it should be ripe for debunking." He also gave note of the performances of Wayans and Kudrow, saying that "Both these experienced comic performers understand that comedy respects no sacred cows. They are merciless in their satirical routines out of respect for the truth of human behavior." Jonathan Rosenbaum from the Chicago Reader said, "It's no masterpiece, but I found it consistently good-hearted and sometimes hilarious, and the sparse crowd I saw it with was laughing as much as I was, especially at the outrageous rap numbers." Entertainment Weeklys Lisa Schwarzbaum commended the movie for being a "lighter-than-Bulworth commentary on class, politics, and art" despite feeling "disconnected from its own objects of ridicule", calling it "a talent-stuffed assemblage of barbs and giddy musical numbers that shouldn't be written off as a feature flop — but savored instead for the cult-ready collection of late-night satirical skits and misses it is."

References

External links
 
 
 
 
 
 

2003 films
2003 romantic comedy films
2000s American films
2000s English-language films
2000s hip hop films
African-American films
American romantic comedy films
Films about interracial romance
Films about Jews and Judaism
Films directed by Richard Benjamin
Films produced by Scott Rudin
Films shot in New York City
Films with screenplays by Paul Rudnick
Paramount Pictures films